Mark John Thurston (born 3 January 1967) is a British electrical engineer and businessman. Since March 2017, he has been the chief executive of High Speed 2, a high speed railway project currently under construction.

Early life
Thurston was born in the London Borough of Sutton. He has a younger brother (born 1969).
He lived in Carshalton, Surrey and attended The Wallington High School for Boys in his senior school years.

From the College of North West London in 1983–1987 he gained a Higher National Certificate in Electrical and Electronic Engineering. He attended Loughborough University from 1999 to 2001 gaining an MSc in Engineering Management.

Career
Thurston began his career as an apprentice with Transport for London. He later worked for Metronet. In June 2008, he joined CH2M as head of structures, bridges and highways. On 26 January 2017, Thurston was appointed chief executive of High Speed 2.

Personal life
Thurston lives in Coulsdon, Surrey. He married Amanda Warrilow in April 1994. They have two daughters (born June 1996 and September 1998).

See also
 Sir David Higgins, Chairman of HS2
 High-speed rail in the United Kingdom

References

External links
 Biography

1967 births
Living people
People educated at Wallington County Grammar School
Alumni of Loughborough University
British rail transport chief executives
High Speed 2
People from Coulsdon
People from the London Borough of Sutton